Season 2002–03 was Airdrie United's first competitive season. They competed in the Second Division, Challenge Cup, League Cup and the Scottish Cup.

Summary
Airdrie United finished third in the Second Division. They reached the third round of the Scottish Cup, the third round of the League Cup and the second round of the Scottish Challenge Cup.

League table

Results and fixtures

Second Division

Challenge Cup

League Cup

Scottish Cup

Player statistics

Squad 

|}
a.  Includes other competitive competitions, including playoffs and the Scottish Challenge Cup.

References

Airdrieonians F.C. seasons
Airdrie United